John Rodney Bass II (born 1964) is an American diplomat, who has served as the Under Secretary of State for Management since December 2021. He was the United States Ambassador to Afghanistan from 2017 to 2020, the United States Ambassador to Turkey from 2014 to 2017 and the United States Ambassador to Georgia from 2009 to 2012.

Career
Bass is from upstate New York. He graduated from Syracuse University in 1986 and was a newspaper editor and political campaign consultant before joining the Foreign Service in 1988. Shortly after, he was posted to Belgium, the Netherlands and Chad.

In 1998, he worked for Deputy Secretary of State Strobe Talbott, first as a special assistant for Europe and Eurasia including as part of the peace negotiations in the Kosovo War. He was later named as Talbott's chief of staff in 2000, coordinating policy on arms reduction with Russia.

In 2005, Bass was named director of the State Department Operations Center. He was sent to Iraq in 2008 as the leader of a provincial reconstruction team. He speaks Italian and French.

In October 2012, he was appointed Executive Secretary of the United States Department of State and served as the liaison between the State Department's many bureaus and the leadership offices of the Secretary, the Deputy Secretaries, and the Director of Policy Planning.

In October 2017, after the U.S. decided to suspend non-immigrant visa services within Turkey, Turkish President Recep Tayyip Erdoğan said the Turkish government would no longer recognize Bass's authority as a U.S. ambassador. The cancellation of visitor visas came after a Turkish court ordered the arrest of an employee of the U.S. Consulate in Istanbul.

After the suspension of visa services in Turkey, Bass published a statement on YouTube.

President Donald Trump named him as his choice to become the United States Ambassador to Afghanistan on July 20, 2017. On September 28, 2017, his nomination was confirmed by the Senate. Bass left the position on January 6, 2020.

On July 21, 2021, President Joe Biden nominated him to serve as Under Secretary of State for Management. On December 18, 2021, he was confirmed by the Senate.

See also
 Turkey–United States relations

References

External links
 John R. Bass at the Office of the Historian

|-

|-

|-

1964 births
Ambassadors of the United States to Georgia (country)
Ambassadors of the United States to Turkey
Living people
Syracuse University alumni
Obama administration personnel
Trump administration personnel
Biden administration personnel
Ambassadors of the United States to Afghanistan
United States Under Secretaries of State
United States Foreign Service personnel
21st-century American diplomats
People from New York (state)